The Right Person is a 1955 featurette made in the United Kingdom by Hammer Film Productions. It was directed by Peter Cotes.

Production

It was filmed almost entirely on one set at Bray Studios, by then Hammer's permanent home. Establishing shots were filmed by producer Michael Carreras and a small crew in the Danish capital of Copenhagen. A short travelogue was also filmed while they were there.

It was shot in Eastmancolor and Cinemascope by Walter J. Harvey. The music was by Eric Winstone.

Plot

Margo Lorenz plays the newly married Martha Jorgensen, who is sat in her Copenhagen hotel room waiting for her husband, Jorgen, to return. She receives a visit from the mysterious Mr. Rasmusson (Douglas Wilmer), who claims to have been a "comrade" of her husband during World War II. He asks her not to tell her husband he is there if he should call.

When Jorgen rings, Martha tells him there is a visitor, but Rasmusson is furious that she has told him he is waiting, and produces a gun. He reveals that he and Jorgenson were two of a group of 12 men in the Danish underground resistance. They were discovered, and ten were shot. Rasmusson concludes that the only other survivor must have been the informer, whom he suspects has returned to the country to claim the equivalent of £5,000 stolen from the organisation. After more than ten years, he has sought out Jorgenson in order to kill him in revenge.

The distraught Martha refuses to believe her husband could have lied to her, but eventually admits she has some doubts.

When Jorgenson (David Markham) arrives home, he and Rasmusson talk, but Rasmusson does not reveal his true intent. After questioning him, Rasmusson establishes that Jorgenson is not the man he is looking for. The threesome drink together, and Rasmusson leaves in a noticeably cheerier mood, thankful to have spared Martha the distress of losing her husband.

Martha is satisfied that her husband has not lied, until the final moments, when Jorgen reveals he has been out for the day on business, settling the estate of a late uncle - who has left him the princely sum of £5,000.

See also
 Hammer filmography

References

External links

British short films
Hammer Film Productions films
Featurettes